The TSHD WD Mersey is a British trailing suction hopper dredger, owned and operated by Boskalis Westminster Ltd (known as Westminster Dredging Company until 2014) and built in Italy. The ship maintained ports around the British Isles, including Liverpool, the Manchester Ship Canal, Harwich, Heysham and the Firth of Clyde

In 2017 she was sold and renamed UMD Hercules.

References

Service vessels of the United Kingdom
Dredgers
Ships built in Venice